Public internet booths are free-standing structures intended to provide public internet access and are analogous to payphones for telephone service. They differ from internet cafes in that they do not offer food or beverages.

In Peru
Peruvian public internet cabins were designed to enable those who do not have a PC or connection to the Internet to go online.

It is estimated that 6 out of 10 households access the internet In metropolitan Lima, Peru using these booths.

Only 39.2% of the population 6 and older has Internet access at home.

References

External links
 
 
 

Internet service providers